Song of a Jewish Cowboy is a 2002 documentary about Scott Gerber, a rancher and musician from Sonoma County, California, who sings cowboy music and Yiddish folk songs. The documentary shows clips from his performances and a personal interview with Scott.

Summary
Scott's parents were socialist chicken ranchers who moved to Petaluma, California. Scott also went into chicken ranching and then dabbled in shearing sheep. He was instilled with a love of his Jewish heritage from his mother and grandmother, and sings many of the songs they taught him. Much of the documentary focuses on the perceptions of others to the differences between Scott's appearance and the music he sings.

See also
Jewish music
Secular Jewish music
A Home on the Range
My Yiddishe Momme McCoy
From Swastika to Jim Crow
Professional Revolutionary
Awake Zion

References

External links

2002 films
American independent films
Petaluma, California
Documentary films about singers
Documentary films about Jews and Judaism in the United States
Yiddish culture in the United States
2002 documentary films
Rural Jewish culture
2000s English-language films
2000s American films